Maxim Roy (born March 7, 1972) is a French-Canadian actress. In English, she is best known for playing Detective Isabelle Latendresse in the English version of the Canadian police drama television series 19-2, Jocelyn Fray in the fantasy series Shadowhunters, and Mob mistress Michelle in Bad Blood.

Career
Roy has worked in theatre, film and television. Her breakthrough was the lead in a thirteen-episode TV series Au nom du Pere et du Fils. She then went on to do the sequel, Le Sorcier. She appeared in Love & Human Remains and in the television film Platinum. Her theatrical work includes roles in musicals and in the play L'Affaire Tartuffe. She appeared in the Golden Reel winning Les Boys in 1999.

Roy is a founder and co-owner of the film production company, Sanna Films. The company's first film Final Four, was written and directed by Roy. She plays a part in a second production, Lotto 6/66, starring Peter Miller and directed by one of Roy's partners, Dominic Laurence James.

Personal life 
She is the sister of Québécois actors Gildor Roy, Luc Roy (with whom she starred in Coyote), and Yvon Roy.

Filmography

Film

Television

References

External links
 
 

1972 births
Canadian film actresses
Canadian television actresses
French Quebecers
Living people
People from Montérégie
Actresses from Quebec
20th-century Canadian actresses
21st-century Canadian actresses